The second of two 1896 municipal elections was held December 14, 1896.  This was the first election to take place on the second Monday of December instead of the second Monday in January.  The election was to elect the town council (consisting of a mayor and six aldermen, each elected for a one-year term), five trustees for the public school division and four trustees for the separate school division.

Voter turnout

Voter turnout figures for the December 1896 municipal election are no longer available.

Results

(bold indicates elected, italics indicate incumbent)

Mayor

John Alexander McDougall was acclaimed as mayor.

Aldermen

 Kenneth McLeod - 111
 Joseph Gariépy - 109
 Thomas Hourston - 105
 Alfred Jackson - 103
 Cornelius Gallagher - 96 (incumbent mayor)
 Daniel Fraser - 90
 William Thomas Henry - 87
 Alfred Brown - 84
 Joseph Henri Picard - 84

Public school trustees

Thomas Bellamy, John Cameron, J Lauder, Matthew McCauley, and Hedley C. Taylor were elected.  Detailed results are no longer available.

Separate (Catholic) school trustees

N D Beck, Sandy Larue, Antonio Prince, and Georges Roy were elected.  Detailed results are no longer available.

References

City of Edmonton: Edmonton Elections

1896-12
1896 elections in Canada
1896 in Alberta
December 1896 events